The Metropolitan Amateur  or Met Amateur is an amateur golf tournament organized by the Metropolitan Golf Association. It has been played annually since 1899 and is one of the oldest amateur golf tournaments in the United States along with the U.S. Amateur and the Western Amateur. It is held at member clubs in New York, New Jersey, and Connecticut.

Winners

2022 Brad Tilley
2021 Garett Engel
2020 Jack Wall
2019 Chris Gotterup
2018 Ryan Davis
2017 Matt Mattare
2016 Stewart Hagestad
2015 Peter Kim
2014 David Pastore
2013 Pat Wilson
2012 Ryan McCormick
2011 Mike Miller
2010 Evan Beirne
2009 Cameron Wilson
2008 Tommy McDonagh
2007 Greg Rohlf
2006 Tommy McDonagh
2005 Ronald Vannelli
2004 Andrew Svoboda
2003 Michael Stamberger
2002 Johnson Wagner
2001 Johnson Wagner
2000 David Kwon
1999 Greg Rohlf
1998 Jerry Courville Jr.
1997 Jerry Courville Jr.
1996 Ken Bakst
1995 Jerry Courville Jr.
1994 Dennis Hillman
1993 Jeff Putman
1992 Mike Muehr
1991 Dennis Slezak
1990 John Baldwin
1989 Dick Siderowf
1988 Jim McGovern
1987 George Zahringer
1986 George Zahringer
1985 George Zahringer
1984 George Zahringer
1983 Mark Diamond
1982 George Zahringer
1981 Peter Van Ingen
1980 Howard Pierson
1979 Jerry Courville, Sr.
1978 Mike Burke Jr.
1977 Dave Ferrell
1976 Bill Britton
1975 Bill Britton
1974 Dick Siderowf
1973 Jerry Courville, Sr.
1972 George Burns
1971 Richard Spears
1970 Dick Siderowf
1969 Dick Siderowf
1968 Dick Siderowf
1967 John C. Baldwin
1966 James E. Fisher
1965 Mark J. Stuart Jr.
1964 Robert W. Gardner
1963 Robert W. Gardner
1962 Robert W. Gardner
1961 Robert W. Gardner
1960 Robert W. Gardner
1959 Paul Kelly
1958 Robert W. Gardner
1957 Paul Kelly
1956 Thomas J. Goodwin
1955 Bobby Kuntz
1954 Frank Strafaci
1953 Wilson Barnes Jr.
1952 Joseph Marra
1951 Joe Gagliardi
1950 Frank Strafaci
1949 Joseph McBride
1948 Ray Billows
1947 Frank Strafaci
1946 Frank Strafaci
1945 Frank Strafaci
1944 E.H. Driggs Jr.
1942–1943 No tournament
1941 Michael Cestone
1940 John P. Burke
1939 Frank Strafaci
1938 Frank Strafaci
1937 Willie Turnesa
1936 George Dunlap
1935 John Parker Jr.
1934 T.S. Tailer Jr.
1933 Mark J. Stuart
1932 T.S. Tailer Jr.
1931 Leonard Martin
1930 M.J. McCarthy Jr.
1929 M.J. McCarthy Jr.
1928 Eugene Homans
1927 E.H. Driggs Jr.
1926 W.M. Reekie
1925 Jess Sweetser
1924 W.M. Reekie
1923 F.W. Dyer
1922 Jess Sweetser
1921 G.W. White
1920 D.E. Sawyer
1919 Oswald Kirkby
1917–1918 No tournament
1916 Oswald Kirkby
1915 Walter Travis
1914 Oswald Kirkby
1913 Jerome Travers
1912 Jerome Travers
1911 Jerome Travers
1910 F. Herreshoff
1909 Walter Travis
1908 Charles H. Seely
1907 Jerome Travers
1906 Jerome Travers
1905 Charles H. Seely
1904 H. Wilcox
1903 Findlay Douglas
1902 Walter Travis
1901 Findlay Douglas
1900 Walter Travis
1899 Herbert M. Harriman

External links
Metropolitan Golf Association
History and list of winners

Amateur golf tournaments in the United States
Golf in Connecticut
Sports competitions in Connecticut
Golf in New Jersey
Golf in New York (state)
1899 establishments in the United States
Recurring sporting events established in 1899